David Tyre Bishop (March 9, 1929 – August 3, 2020) was an American lawyer and politician.

Bishop was born in Syracuse, New York. He graduated from Nottingham High School in Syracuse. He graduated from Hamilton College in 1951 and received his master's degree from the John F. Kennedy School of Government at the Harvard University in 1962. Bishop also received his law degree from Cornell Law School in 1954. Bishop lived in Rochester, Minnesota with his wife and family and practiced law. He served in the Minnesota House of Representatives from 1983 to 1992 and 1993 to 2002 and was a Republican.

References

1929 births
2020 deaths
Lawyers from Syracuse, New York
Politicians from Syracuse, New York
Politicians from Rochester, Minnesota
Minnesota lawyers
Cornell Law School alumni
Hamilton College (New York) alumni
Harvard Kennedy School alumni
Republican Party members of the Minnesota House of Representatives